News at One may refer to:

 BBC News at One, on BBC One and the BBC News channel
 RTÉ News at One, on RTÉ Radio 1
 ITV Lunchtime News, previously ITV News at 1.30 and News at One
 The Live Desk (Sky), previously Sky News at One